Demirkan is a Turkish surname. Notable people with the surname include:

 Demir Demirkan (born 1972), Turkish musician and composer
 Renan Demirkan (born 1955), Turkish-German writer and actress

Turkish-language surnames